Philodanidae is a family of mites in the order Mesostigmata.

Taxonomy
 Afrophilodana
 Afrophilodana africana
 Philodana
 Philodana johnstoni

Mesostigmata
Acari families